Malt loaf is a type of sweet leavened bread made with malt extract as a primary ingredient. It has a chewy texture and often contains raisins. It is usually eaten sliced and spread with butter for tea. Malt flour is sometimes used to supplement the flavour.

History

In 1889, John Montgomerie of Scotland filed a U.S. patent application titled "Making Malted Bread," which was granted in 1890. This patent asserted a prior patent existed in Great Britain dated 1886. Montgomerie claimed a novel saccharification process, which involved warming a portion of dough mixed with diastatic malt extract to an appropriate mash temperature and holding it for a time to allow the extract's enzymes to break down some of the starch into maltose.

Commercial production

"Soreen" is a brand of malt loaf manufactured in the United Kingdom. The name is derived from "Sorensen", the name of the family that once owned the company, and "Green", a business partner. In 2004, Warburtons sold the brand to Inter Link Foods. In 2007, Soreen became part of McCambridge Group. In 2014, UK food group Samworth Brothers bought the Soreen brand for an undisclosed sum.

"Harvo" was a brand of malt loaf which was made at the company's bakery at 257 Lawley Street, Birmingham until the company went bankrupt in 1973. In some areas, the name Harvo or Harvo Loaf is still often used to describe malt loaf, regardless of the brand.
  The Harvo trademark was later held by one of the Premier Foods companies, associated with its takeover of Rank Hovis McDougall, RHBB (IP) Ltd; The Harvo trademark expired in 2006.

Variants in other countries
In December and during the holiday season, a similar type of bread called vörtbröd (literally “wort bread”) is popular in Scandinavia. The dough's water is supplied by beer wort, adding sweetness and flavour to the bread. Several different spices and fruits commonly associated with Christmas are also added, e.g., cloves, cinnamon, ginger, cardamom and raisins.
Malt bread is one of many variants of baguettes sold in Russia. It is produced in local city bakeries.

See also

Brown bread
Raisin bread
Tea loaf
 List of breads
 List of desserts

References

External links

Soreen website
McCambridge website
photo of Harvo badge

British breads
Sweet breads
Loaf